The 1999 Goody's Headache Powder 500 was a NASCAR Winston Cup Series racing event that took place August 28, 1999, at Bristol Motor Speedway in Bristol, Tennessee.

The race was the 23rd of the 1999 NASCAR Winston Cup Series season. The pole position was held by Joe Gibbs Racing's Tony Stewart, who also led the most laps with 225. The race winner was Dale Earnhardt of Richard Childress Racing, who started 26th, the lowest starting position for a winner at Bristol.

Race report
The early part of the race was primarily dominated by Tony Stewart. Terry Labonte ran into Dale Earnhardt three times in the last half lap, then blew his entry into turn one. That allowed Dale to close and tap him. Labonte was so out of shape he could not hold on, then he stood on the gas and wrecked everybody behind him. On lap 410, the caution flew after Dave Marcis' car stopped against the turn-2 wall. Upon the caution flag-waving, Marcis proceeded to drive away, and as Marcis was frequently aided by Richard Childress Racing, suspicions arose over whether or not Marcis intentionally caused a caution. NASCAR then penalized Marcis, and made him stay in pit road for a lap; NASCAR stated that Marcis claimed he could not reach pit road, and had to stop. However, NASCAR said Marcis had a chance to reach pit road on the two laps he was driving slowly before stopping. On the restart, Terry Labonte led the race, and on lap 435, Earnhardt passed Labonte for the lead. However, Labonte then passed Earnhardt with 57 laps left, but on lap 490, Labonte slowed down and was spun by Darrell Waltrip, giving the lead back to Earnhardt.

Labonte then pitted for new tires, and eventually, with five laps remaining, Labonte contested Earnhardt for the lead, setting up the finish. Terry Labonte was leading on the last lap, but he was spun by Earnhardt in turn 2, and Earnhardt secured his ninth victory at Bristol. Jimmy Spencer finished second, followed by Ricky Rudd, Jeff Gordon, and Stewart. Labonte finished in 8th, and one lap down. Earnhardt's victory was subsequently met by boos and obscene gestures from the crowd. NASCAR officials reviewed the pass but decided to let Earnhardt keep the victory. Earnhardt later stated, "I didn’t mean to wreck him, I just wanted to rattle his cage a bit." 

A similar incident between Earnhardt and Labonte had occurred four years prior, at the Goody's 500; Earnhardt turned Labonte sideways, and Labonte was pushed by Earnhardt past the finish line sideways, giving Labonte the win.

Top 10 finishers

Standings after the race

Source:

References

Goody's Headache Powder 500
Goody's Headache Powder 500
NASCAR races at Bristol Motor Speedway